The Basri Shah Mosque is oldest mosque of Kolkata, India. It is situated in the Chitpur-Cossipore area of Kolkata district, at the junction of Panchanan Mukherjee Road and Sett Pukur Road. It is one of heritage sites listed by Kolkata Municipal Corporation.

There are three domes and four minarets in the mosque.

History

Before the establishment of Kolkata there was an old mosque in the place of present Basri Shah Mosque. The present mosque was built in 1219 Hijri by Jafir Ali. The mosque was named after the shrine of Basri Shah situated nearby. Basri was a saint who was from Basra in Iraq and settled in Kolkata sometimes between 1760 and 1790. After his death a shrine was made by his followers.
The mosque had been abandoned for many years. Kolkata Municipal Corporation added the mosque to its heritage list with renovation work.

See also
 Mosques in Kolkata

References

Note

External links
 
 Heritage List With Grade (PDF) :: Kolkata Municipal Corporation

Religious buildings and structures in Kolkata
Mosques in West Bengal
Tourist attractions in Kolkata
Murshidabadi architecture
Mosques completed in 1804
Mosques in Kolkata